Michele Paco Castagna (born 4 March 1994) is an international speedway rider from Italy.

Speedway career 
Castagna is three times Italian Champion, winning the Italian Individual Speedway Championship in 2017, 2018, and 2022. He has also won the Italian Junior Championship three times (2011, 2012, 2014). He has ridden in the British Speedway leagues since 2015, riding for various clubs. In 2019 and 2021 he rode for the Birmingham Brummies.

In 2022, he rode for the Edinburgh Monarchs in the SGB Championship 2022. He won his third Italian Individual Speedway Championship during 2022. During 2022, he also won the Argentine Championship.

In 2023, he re-signed for the Monarchs for the SGB Championship 2023.

Personal life
His father Armando Castagna was a professional speedway rider from 1985 to 2001 and was a 12 times national champion.

References 

Living people
1994 births
Italian speedway riders
Birmingham Brummies riders
Edinburgh Monarchs riders
Ipswich Witches riders
Sheffield Tigers riders
People from Arzignano
Sportspeople from the Province of Vicenza